The M123 engine family was a straight-6 automobile engine from Mercedes-Benz, used from 1976 to 1984 in the W123 series models 250 and 250 T. It replaced the 6-cylinder engines M180 in the 230 and M130 in the 250 (2.8 liter) versions from the W114 series.

The M123 was succeeded by the M103, introduced in 1984 with the M124 series.

Characteristics
Like the M180, the M123 only has four crankshaft bearings and its oil pump, fuel pump and distributor are driven by a shaft inclined at the front end of the motor, which in turn is driven through a sprocket and a helical gear pair.

Unlike the M180's paired cylinder spacing, the M123’s is uniform like in the M130. So, instead of cooling ducts cast between the cylinders, slots in the cylinders’ partition walls are traversed by coolant.

The engine has a single overhead camshaft (SOHC), driven by a chain. The vertical hanging valves are arranged in two rows, operated by rocker levers. As with the M115, inlet and outlet both are on the right side of the engine. Within the cylinder head there is (on the left side of the engine) a recessed combustion chamber (with a flat piston crown), in which the exhaust valve and the spark plug are located while the remaining area (on the right side) forms a squish area that is intended to swirl the fuel-air-mixture in the combustion chamber.

Fuel-air mixture was generated by a Solex 4A1 carburetor. It is of the double-register type, as with the previous model W114. That means each of the two sets of mixing systems feeds three cylinders and each of these two sets is composed of a first relatively small mixing system for idling and a second, larger mixing system for higher load and higher speeds. At idle and up to about one-third load only the smaller tube of each set is mechanically operated by the accelerator pedal, while the second tube of each set is enabled by a vacuum cell only at high load and high engine speed. All four (2 x 2) tubes are supplied with fuel by a central float chamber. The engine is equipped with gasoline feed line and gasoline return line (which usually was more typical for fuel injection engines) achieving a cooling effect which protects from vapor locks, that would cause starting problems in hot weather.

The M123’s relatively quiet operation was marred by high gasoline consumption, although the engine actually reached its most important development goal of being more economical than the carbureted 280 models.

Customer perspective, further development, withdrawal
While the rest of the 123 series’ engine range was taken over from its predecessor satisfactorily, the M123 did not quite convince customers, although it is the only engine that was newly developed for this series.

But especially after the launch of the new four-cylinder M102 in the 200 and 230 E models, the customer interest fell sharply since the M102 did almost everything better while its petrol consumption was significantly lower.

In October 1981, the engine has been further revised to reduce consumption by changing the combustion chambers in the cylinder head.

In 1982 the estate version was not available with the M123 anymore (250 T). And although the engine was available until 1985 in the sedan (250), it did not play an appreciable role in sales anymore.

The M123’s direct replacement, the 2.6 liter variant of the M103 (starting 1984), was better in every way: that engine not only was cheaper to produce, lighter and much more fuel-efficient, it was running smoother and also had more power and increased revving vivacity compared with the more sedate M123.

More than 30 years after its introduction, the M123 is now regarded as a somewhat classic Mercedes-Benz engine.

The capable but complex Solex 4A1 carburetor is seen as difficult to repair and adjust nowadays. Some specific weakness left aside, any double-register carburetor might be regarded as the most complicated device to generate fuel-air mixture widely used in passenger cars. With prevalence of the three-way catalytic converter (needing specific air fuel ratio) double-register carburetors became obsolete and were replaced temporarily by electronically controlled simpler carburetors and then finally by fuel injection systems that are more reliable in the long term and can be easily maintained.

M123.920

Applications:
 1976-1979 250
 1976-1979 250T
 1979-1985 250 Long (base )
 1976-1979 250 chassis with elongated base

M123.921
The revised M123.921 was also a  engine. September 1979 - December 1985.

Applications:
 1979-1985 250
 1979-1985 250T
 1979-1985 250 Long (base )
 1979-1985 250 chassis with elongated base

See also
 Mercedes-Benz M180 engine
 List of Mercedes-Benz engines

M123
Straight-six engines
Gasoline engines by model